Desert Mesa is a seriously low-budget American B-movie Western directed by Victor Adamson for his independent production company. Some sources state that the film was re-released as Mormon Conquest in 1941, while others believe Mormon Conquest is a separate film from the same filmmakers.

References 

1935 films
1935 Western (genre) films
American Western (genre) films
Films directed by Victor Adamson
1930s American films